Leefructus is an extinct genus of eudicot plants which existed in Yixian Formation, China during the early Cretaceous period. It was first named by Ge Sun, David L. Dilcher, Hongshan Wang and Zhiduan Chen in 2011 and the type species is Leefructus mirus.

References

Prehistoric angiosperm genera
Fossil taxa described in 2011
Eudicots